Stomphastis labyrinthica is a moth of the family Gracillariidae. It is known from India (Bihar) and Japan (Kyūshū).

The larvae feed on Guazuma tomentosa, Guazuma ulmifolia and Trema (including Trema orientalis). They probably mine the leaves of their host plant.

References

Stomphastis
Moths of Asia
Moths of Japan